Ablaxia is a genus of wasps in the family Pteromalidae.

References

Pteromalidae